The Roman Catholic Archdiocese of Salzburg is an archdiocese of the Latin Church of the Roman Catholic Church in Austria. The archdiocese is one of two Austrian archdioceses, serving alongside the Archdiocese of Vienna.

The Archbishopric of Salzburg was a prince-bishopric of the Holy Roman Empire until 1803, when it was secularized as the Electorate of Salzburg. The archdiocese was reestablished in 1818 without temporal power.

Suffragan dioceses 
 Feldkirch
 Graz–Seckau
 Gurk
 Innsbruck

Episcopal Ordinaries

Abbot-Bishops of Iuvavum c. 300s – c. 482
 St. Maximus of Salzburg, died 476.
Abandoned after c. 482

Bishops of Iuvavum (from 755, Salzburg)
St. Ruprecht, born c. 543 or c. 698 – c. 718.
Vitalis
Erkenfried
Ansologus
Ottokar
Flobrigis
Johann I
St. Virgil, c. 745 or c. 767 – c. 784

Archbishops of Salzburg, 798–1213
 Arno 784–821
 Adalram 821–836
 Leutram 836–859
 Adalwin 859–873
 Adalbert I 873
 Dietmar I 873–907
 Pilgrim I 907–923
 Adalbert II 923–935
 Egilholf 935–939
 Herhold 939–958
 Friedrich I 958–991
 Hartwig 991–1023
 Günther 1024–1025
 Dietmar II 1025–1041
 Baldwin 1041–1060
 Gebhard 1060–1088
 Thiemo 1090–1101
 Konrad I von Abensberg 1106–1147
 Eberhard I von Hilpolstein-Biburg 1147–1164
 (Conradus II) Konrad II of Austria 1164–1168
 Adalbert III of Bohemia 1168–1177
 Conrad III 1177–1183
 Adalbert III of Bohemia (restored) 1183–1200

Prince-Archbishops of Salzburg, 1213–1803
 Eberhard II of Regensburg 1200–1246
 Bernhard I of Ziegenhain 1247
 Philipp of Carinthia 1247–1256
 Ulrich of Sekau 1256–1265
 Ladislaus of Salzburg 1265–1270
 Frederick II of Walchen 1270–1284
 Rudolf of Hoheneck 1284–1290
 Conrad IV of Breitenfurt 1291–1312
 Weichard of Pollheim 1312–1315
 Frederick III of Leibnitz 1315–1338
 Henry of Pirnbrunn 1338–1343
 Ordulf of Wiesseneck 1343–1365
 Pilgrim II of Pucheim 1365–1396
 Gregor Schenk von Osterwitz † (6 Jun 1396 Appointed – 9 May 1403 Died)
 Berthold von Wehingen † (6 Feb 1404 Appointed – 13 Jan 1406 Resigned)
 Eberhard von Neuhaus † (13 Jan 1406 Confirmed – 18 Jan 1427 Died)
 Eberard von Starhemberg † (11 Apr 1427 Confirmed – 9 Feb 1429 Died)
Johann von Reisberg † (1429 Elected – 1441 Died) 
Friedrich Truchseß von Emmerberg † (30 Sep 1441 Elected – 3 Apr 1452 Died) 
Sigmund von Volkersdorf † (10 Apr 1452 Elected – 3 Nov 1461 Died) 
Burkhard von Weißpriach † (16 Nov 1461 Elected – 16 Feb 1466 Died) 
Bernhard von Rohr † (25 Feb 1466 Elected – 21 Mar 1487 Died) 
Johann Beckenschlager † (21 Mar 1487 Succeeded – 15 Dec 1489 Died) 
Friedrich Graf von Schaumberg † (19 Dec 1489 Elected – 4 Oct 1494 Died) 
Sigmund von Hollenegg † (16 Oct 1494 Elected – 3 Jul 1495 Died) 
Leonhard von Keutschach, C.R.S.A. † (7 Jul 1495 Elected – 8 Jun 1519 Died) 
Matthäus Lang von Wellenburg † (8 Jun 1519 Succeeded – 30 Mar 1540 Died) 
Michael von Kuenburg † (21 Jul 1554 Elected – 17 Nov 1560 Died) 
Johann Jakob von Kuen-Belasy † (28 Nov 1560 Elected – 4 May 1586 Died) 
Georg von Kuenburg † (4 May 1586 Succeeded – 25 Jan 1587 Died)
Wolf Dietrich von Raitenau † (2 Mar 1587 Elected – 7 Mar 1612 Resigned)
Markus Sittikus von Hohenems † (18 Mar 1612 Elected – 9 Oct 1619 Died)

Paris Reichsgraf von Lodron † (13 Nov 1618 Elected – 15 Dec 1653 Died) 
Guidobald Reichsgraf von Thun † (3 Feb 1654 Elected – 1 Jun 1668 Died) 
Maximilian Gandolf Reichsgraf von Kuenburg † (30 Jul 1668 Elected – 3 May 1687 Died) 
Johann Ernst Reichsgraf von Thun † (30 Jun 1687 Elected  – 20 Apr 1709 Died) 
Franz Anton Fürst von Harrach zu Rorau † (20 Apr 1709 Succeeded – 18 Jul 1727 Died) 
Leopold Anton Eleutherius Reichsfreiherr von Firmian † (4 Oct 1727 Elected – 22 Oct 1744 Died) 
Jakob Ernst Graf von Liechtenstein-Kastelkorn † (13 Jan 1745 Elected – 12 Jun 1747 Died) 
Andreas Jakob Reichsgraf von Dietrichstein † (10 Sep 1747 Elected – 5 Jan 1753 Died) 
Sigismund Christoph Graf von Schrattenbach † (5 Apr 1753 Elected – 16 Dec 1771 Died) 
Hieronymus Joseph Franz de Paula Graf Colloredo von Wallsee und Mels † (14 Mar 1772 Elected – 20 May 1812 Died)

Archbishops (from 1823)
 Augustin Johann Joseph Gruber (17 November 1823 Confirmed – 28 June 1835 Died)
 Friedrich Johann Joseph Cölestin zu von Schwarzenberg (1 February 1836 Confirmed – 20 May 1850 Confirmed)
 Maximilian Joseph von Tarnóczy (17 Feb 1851 Confirmed – 4 April 1876 Died)
 Franz de Paula Albert Eder, O.S.B. (29 Sep 1876 Confirmed – 10 April 1890 Died)
 Johannes Evangelist Haller (26 June 1890 Confirmed – 5 May 1900 Died)
 Johannes Baptist Katschthaler (17 December 1900 Confirmed – 27 February 1914 Died)
 Balthasar Kaltner (25 May 1914 Confirmed – 8 July 1918 Died)
 Ignaz Rieder (7 October 1918 Confirmed – 8 October 1934 Died)
 Sigismund Waitz (17 December 1934 Confirmed – 30 October 1941 Died)
 Andreas Rohracher (1 May 1943 Confirmed – 30 June 1969 Retired)
 Eduard Macheiner (18 October 1969 Confirmed – 17 July 1972 Died)
 Karl Berg (9 January 1973 Confirmed – 5 September 1988 Retired)

 Georg Eder (17 January 1989 Confirmed – 23 November 2002 Resigned)
 Alois Kothgasser, S.D.B. (27 November 2002 Appointed – 4 November 2013 Retired)
 Franz Lackner, O.F.M. (18 November 2013 Appointed – present)

References 
 

Salzburg
Salzburg
 
Salzburg
Prince-Archbishopric of Salzburg